Flew is a surname of English origin. People with the surname include:

 Antony Flew (1923–2010), English philosopher who renounced his atheism
 Robert Newton Flew (1886–1962), English Methodist minister and theologian
 Terry Flew, Australian professor of media and communication

Surnames of English origin